Davide Scaramuzza (born April 2, 1980, in Terni) is an Italian professor of robotics at the University of Zurich, specialising on micro air vehicles.

Education
Scaramuzza earned his master's degree from the University of Perugia in 2004 and a Ph.D. in robotic perception from ETH Zurich in 2008, where he worked with  Roland Siegwart.  He completed further postdoctoral research at the University of Pennsylvania under roboticists, Vijay Kumar, and Kostas Daniilidis.

Career
In 2012, Scaramuzza became a professor at the University of Zurich, where he founded the "Robotics and Perception Group".

Scaramuzza's research focuses on the autonomous navigation of micro air vehicles (or miniature drones) via onboard cameras and computation, and on drone racing, as well as on event cameras.

In 2015, Scaramuzza cofounded Zurich-Eye, which later became Facebook Zurich, which uses Zurich Eye's technology in Oculus Quest.

Scaramuzza's research has appeared in The New York Times, BBC News, la Repubblica, and Neue Zürcher Zeitung, MIT Technology Review, Wired, and IEEE Spectrum.

Awards
 ERC Consolidator Grant (2019)
 Misha Mahowald Prize for Neuromorphic Engineering (2017)
 IEEE Robotics and Automation Society Early Career Award (2014)
 Google Faculty Research Award (2014)
 European Young Research Award (2012)

Publications

References 

1980 births
Italian roboticists
Living people
University of Perugia alumni
Academic staff of the University of Zurich
People from Terni
European Research Council grantees
21st-century Italian scientists
ETH Zurich alumni